The War Department Light Railways were a system of narrow gauge trench railways run by the British War Department in World War I. Light railways made an important contribution to the Allied war effort in the First World War, and were used for the supply of ammunition and stores, the transport of troops and the evacuation of the wounded.

Track gauges

The military light railways in France were of  gauge and used a variety of steam and petrol locomotives from French, British and American builders. The Germans installed their  gauge Feldbahn system early in the war.  Trench railways of the World War I western front produced the greatest concentration of minimum-gauge railway locomotives observed to date.

Development

Britain came to the belated realisation that it needed a flexible and reliable method of supplying the front lines, bringing shells, timber, and fodder from the rear areas and their standard gauge supply points. Narrow gauge light railways were the solution.

Hundreds of locomotives were built by companies such as Hunslet, Kerr Stuart, ALCO, Davenport, Motor Rail and Baldwin to work these lines. Also, Model T Ford conversions were used. Thirty or so Companies were formed within the Royal Engineers to staff the lines. These were mostly British ex-railwaymen pressed into service, though Australian, South African and Canadian gangs served with distinction. An American unit also served under the British flag.

Each area of the front would have its own light rail to bring up materiel.  The British perfected roll on roll off train ferries to bring fodder and supplies direct from England via train ferries to France. Northern French rail lines were under direct military control of the Army in the area.

By 1917, the Canadians led the way in showing the utility of light railways. Having built thousands of miles of new frontier track in Western Canada in the previous decades, these "colonials", led by J. Stewart, supplied the Canadian Corps who went on to victory at Vimy. The ebb and flow of war meant that rail lines were built and rebuilt, moved and used elsewhere, but by the latter years of Passchendaele, Amiens and Argonne, light railways came into their own and pulled for the final victory.

WDLR locomotives

A large number of locomotives (mostly of  gauge) was ordered for the WDLR.  These included:

Steam

 Hudson 0-6-0WT (built by Hudswell Clarke)
 Barclay 0-6-0WT
 Hunslet 4-6-0T
 Baldwin Class 10-12-D 4-6-0T
 ALCO 2-6-2T

Dimensions

Internal combustion

 Motor Rail (Simplex) , petrol
 Motor Rail (Simplex) , petrol
 British Westinghouse , petrol-electric
 Baguley , petrol-paraffin engine based on a McEwan Pratt design

Dimensions

Captured
A few captured German feldbahn locomotives were also used but these usually had short lives because no spare parts were available for them.

Other locomotives

Both the French Army and the U.S. Army had their own locomotives, which included:

French Army

 Decauville Progrès type 0-6-0T
 Pechot Bourdon 0-4-4-0T articulated locomotive
 Kerr, Stuart Decauville/Joffre type 0-6-0T+t (based on the Decauville Progrès type)

U.S. Army

 Baldwin 2-6-2T

Preserved locomotives

Baldwin

Probably the most famous of these war service engines were of class 10-12-D, built by the Baldwin Locomotive Works, U.S.  Nearly 500 were built and those that survived the war found new homes around the world.  Many went to India and after the war a few went to railways in Britain including:

 Ashover Light Railway
 Glyn Valley Tramway
 Snailbeach District Railways
 Welsh Highland Railway
 Rainham Cement in Kent
Four of this type of locomotive have been repatriated from India and preserved in the UK, two in full working order, and the other two undergoing restoration in 2021.

Hunslet
Hunslet 4-6-0 Locomotive no. 1215 of 1916, was repatriated from Australia in 2008 where she had worked since 1924 on the sugar cane railways of Queensland, before ending up at Rowan Bay Bush Children's Home in a playground around 1962. She is currently in full working order at the Moseley Railway Trust's Apedale Valley Light Railway, Newcastle-under-Lyme, Staffordshire, United Kingdom.

Hunslet 4-6-0 Locomotive no. 1218 of 1916, formerly of Gin Gin Mill, is currently with D.Revell, Weewaa, New South Wales, Australia. This is the locomotive which is now preserved at the Australian War Memorial, Canberra, Australia, although she may be in store and not on public display.

Hunslet 4-6-0 Locomotive no. 1229 of 1916, formerly of Cattle Creek Mill, is currently stored at ANGRMS, Woodford QLD, Australia. Awaiting restoration.

Hunslet 4-6-0 Locomotive no. 1239 of 1916, retrieved from a public park in Mackay, restored at the Rail Workshops Museum, currently on display at the Rail Workshops Museum, North Ipswich, Queensland, Australia

The Motor Rail & Tramcar Co Ltd,
Surplus Motor Rail internal combustion locomotives were sold off after the war and provided service for decades in industrial narrow gauge railways systems, such as the Leighton Buzzard Light Railway. The larger (40HP) locomotives came in 'open', 'protected', and 'armoured' versions resulting in the curious spectacle of fully armoured locomotives appearing in an industrial context. Many locomotives were overhauled and/or modified by Kent Construction & Engineering Co. Ltd of Ashford which can complicate identifying locomotives (for example "Mary Ann" - the Ffestiniog Loco).

See also

British military narrow-gauge railways
Trench railways
Light railway
Railway Operating Division
John Stewart
Foley, Welch and Stewart

References

Sources

Further reading
 
 
 
 
 
 
 
 

Military railways in the United Kingdom
World War I military equipment of the United Kingdom